The Contact is a 1997 South Korean romance film directed by Chang Yoon-hyun. Starring Han Suk-kyu and Jeon Do-yeon, it was the second biggest-grossing Korean film of 1997 with 674,933 admissions, and was awarded the Grand Bell Awards for best picture.

Plot
One day, radio DJ Dong-hyeon (Han Suk-kyu) receives an anonymous package containing a Velvet Underground record. Dong-hyeon hopes that the record was sent by his former lover. He decides to play the song Pale Blue Eyes off of that record. At the same time, a home shopping telemarketer, Soo-hyeon (Jeon Do-yeon) listens to the radio program while driving her car.

The next day, Soo-hyeon makes a request through the internet for Dong-hyeon to play the song again. Dong-hyeon then contacts Soo-hyeon, hoping she is his former girlfriend or someone he knows.

Cast
Jeon Do-yeon as Soo-hyeon 
Han Suk-kyu as Dong-hyeon
Chu Sang-mi as Eun-hee
Park Yong-soo
Choi Cheol-ho  
Kim Tae-woo
Lee Beom-soo
Kim Min-kyung as female employee at convenience store

Awards
1997 Grand Bell Awards
 Best Film
 Best Editing - Park Gok-ji
 Best Adapted Screenplay - Chang Yoon-hyun 
 Best New Actress - Jeon Do-yeon

1997 Blue Dragon Film Awards
 Best New Actress - Jeon Do-yeon

1998 Baeksang Arts Awards
 Most Popular Actress (Film) - Jeon Do-yeon

1998 Korean Association of Film Critics Awards
 Best New Actress - Jeon Do-yeon

References

External links 
 
 The Contact at Koreanfilm.org

1997 films
1997 romantic drama films
South Korean romantic drama films
Films about radio people
Films set in Seoul
Films shot in Seoul
Films directed by Chang Yoon-hyun
Best Picture Grand Bell Award winners
Myung Films films
1990s Korean-language films